Grapholita orobana is a moth belonging to the family Tortricidae. The species was first described by Georg Friedrich Treitschke in 1830. It is native to the Palearctic.

The wingspan is 11-15mm.The palpi are whitish. Forewings dark brown, sometimes sprinkled with pale ochreous ; costa with strong ochreous-white strigulae, some ending in leaden metallic
marks ; a long moderately broad curved ochreous white median dorsal blotch ; ocellus paler, edged with leaden-metallic, with several black dashes. Hindwings in male whitish with broad dark fuscous terminal border, in female dark fuscous, lighter basally.The larva is deep
yellow, brownish-tinged ; head and plate of 2 almost black.

The larvae feed on Vicia spp., eating the ripening seeds. The moths fly in the sunshine in July.

References

Grapholitini
Moths described in 1830